Michael or Mike Shepherd may refer to:

 Michael Shepherd (psychiatrist) (1923–1995), British psychiatrist
 Michael B. Shepherd (born 1977), American biblical scholar
 Michael Shepherd (voice actor), in The Little Prince (2010 TV series)
 Michael Shepherd, pseudonym of the author Robert Ludlum (1927–2001)
 Mike Shepherd (author) (born 1947), American science fiction writer